"Ain't My Bitch" is a song by American heavy metal band Metallica from their sixth album, Load. It is the opening track of the album and was released as a promotional single in Mexico. It reached number 15 on the Billboard Mainstream Rock chart.

"Ain't My Bitch" gained media attention and notoriety due to its title. Vocalist/lyricist James Hetfield later explained that the 'bitch' in the song does not refer to a woman, but acts as a metaphor for a problem. Under this interpretation, the song takes on a decidedly different theme, dealing with a person who harbors no concern for other people's problems.

Lead guitarist Kirk Hammett used a slide for the guitar solo, a first for Metallica and one of the many musical departures found on Load. Upon the album's release in June 1996, "Ain't My Bitch" quickly became a staple in the band's live set, featured regularly during their Poor Touring Me world tour. The song was last played in 1998, and as of 2019, has yet to since be included in the band's setlist rotation.

The song's demo was simply named "Bitch" and was recorded on April 6, 1995.

Track listing

References

External links
 

1996 songs
Metallica songs
Songs written by James Hetfield
Songs written by Lars Ulrich
Song recordings produced by Bob Rock